Molly June Gordon  is an American actress. She is best known for her roles in the drama TV series Animal Kingdom (2016–2018), and in the comedy films Life of the Party (2018), Booksmart (2019), and Good Boys (2019).

Early life 
Gordon was born and raised in Los Angeles, to Jewish parents. She is the daughter of director Bryan Gordon and writer-director Jessie Nelson. She performed on the LA stage from a young age, and grew up with actor Ben Platt, with whom she starred in productions of Fiddler on the Roof at age four and How to Succeed in Business Without Really Trying at age five. She regularly watched the sketch-comedy series Saturday Night Live and attended performances by comedy troupe The Groundlings, leading her to an interest pursuing comedic acting. She portrayed Dot in her high school's performance of Sunday in the Park with George when she was 17. She did poorly on her SAT exam, but briefly attended New York University, leaving after two weeks due to dissatisfaction with her program.  Her aunt, Davia Nelson, is one of The Kitchen Sisters, who are radio producers.

Career 
Gordon's first film appearance was in Nelson's 2001 drama film I Am Sam as Callie, followed by her portrayal of a trick-or-treater in Nora Ephron's 2005 film Bewitched.

Gordon moved to New York City in 2014 to pursue acting as a profession. In August 2015, she was cast as Nicky in the TNT pilot Animal Kingdom, based on the 2010 Australian film of the same name. The pilot was picked up with a 10-episode order in December 2015, and the series debuted on June 14, 2016, with Gordon as a series regular.

She played Maddie, the daughter of Melissa McCarthy's character, in the 2018 comedy film Life of the Party.

Gordon began rehearsals to portray Alice Spencer in the Off-Broadway production of Alice by Heart in December 2018. The musical, directed by her mother, Nelson, who also co-wrote with Steven Sater, opened at the MCC Theater on February 26, 2019. The show's run concluded in May 2019. Gordon portrayed Triple A in the 2019 comedy film Booksmart. The film attracted Gordon due to its "kooky" characters that she found to "have such a grounded realism in them."

On June 9, 2022, it was announced that Gordon would produce, star, and co-direct the musical comedy film Theater Camp, inspired by the 2020 short film of the same name co-written with Noah Galvin, Ben Platt, and Nick Lieberman. The film had its world premiere at the 2023 Sundance Film Festival on January 21, 2023.

Filmography

Film

Television

Theatre

References

External links 
 

Living people
21st-century American actresses
Actresses from Los Angeles
American film actresses
American stage actresses
American television actresses
Jewish American actresses
1995 births
21st-century American Jews